The Howrah – Balurghat Bi-Weekly Express is an Express train belonging to Eastern Railway zone that runs between Howrah Junction and Balurghat in India. It is currently being operated with 13063/13064 train numbers on Bi-Weekly basis.

Overview

It runs on Mondays and Tuesdays of every week and connects important stations Such as Azimganj, Malda, Eklakhi and Buniadpur. It is the fastest Express bound for Balurghatother than Gour Express and Tebhaga Express.it runs via the Azimganj - Nalhati route.
The 13063/Howrah – Balurghat Bi-Weekly Express has an average speed of 38 km/hr and covers 439 km in 11h 35m. The 13064/Balurghat – Howrah Bi-Weekly Express has an average speed of 45 km/hr and covers 439 km in 9h 45m.

Timing and halts 

The train departs from Platform #6  of Howrah Junction at 7:55 and arrives in Balurghat at Platform #2 at 19:30, the same day. From Platform #1Balurghat, the train departs at 20:30 and arrives in Howrah Junction at Platform #6 or #7 at 6:15, the next day.

The important halts of the train are:

 
 
 
 
 
 
 
 
 
 
  (Experimental Till 31/03/2018)

Classes

The train usually consists 15 standard ICF coaches. During day 3 Chair cars are attached with it instead of 3 sleeper classes. It does not carry any pantry car :

 2 AC II Tier Cum III Tiers
 Day : 2 Sleeper Classes + 3 Chair cars
 Night : 5 Sleeper Classes
 6 General (unreserved)
 2 Seating (Disabled/Ladies) cum Luggage Rakes

Coach composition
Howrah to Balurghat:

Balurghat to Howrah :

Loco Link

As the route is not electrified, a Howrah Diesel Loco Shed based ALCO-251C Indian locomotive class WDM-3A locomotive pulls the train to its destination.

Rake sharing

The train shares its rakes with 13043/13044 Howrah - Raxaul Express.

See also 

 Howrah Junction railway station
 Balurghat railway station
 Howrah - Rampurhat Express
 Howrah - Siuri Intercity Express

Notes

External links 

 13063/Howrah - Balurghat Bi-Weekly Express
 13064/Balurghat - Howrah Bi-Weekly Express

References 

Rail transport in Howrah
Express trains in India
Rail transport in West Bengal
Railway services introduced in 2014